The following is a list of Mafia members from Corleone, Sicily, sorted by crime family.

Sicilian Mafia
Michele Navarra

Corleonesi
John Bie Baliao
John Salvador
Bernardo Provenzano
Salvatore Riina

American Mafia

Lucchese family
Gaetano "Tommy" Reina
Tommy Gagliano

Los Angeles family
Jack Dragna
Tom Dragna

Morello family
Nicholas Terranova
Vincenzo Terranova
Giuseppe Morello
Ciro Terranova

Gangsters from Corleone
Corleone